The Pine Ridge is an escarpment between the Niobrara River and the White River in far northwestern Nebraska (a small section extends into South Dakota).  The high tableland between the rivers has been eroded into a region of forested buttes, ridges and canyons.

Ecology
The plant and animal life in the Pine Ridge is atypical for Nebraska; the ecology is very similar to the Black Hills,  to the north.  The dominant tree in the Pine Ridge is the ponderosa pine; deciduous trees (such as cottonwoods) are also present in canyon bottoms.  The Pine Ridge is one of two regions in Nebraska that support bighorn sheep; elk, river otters, mule deer, and wild turkeys are also common.

History
The Pine Ridge region was the setting of the closing chapters of the Indian Wars.  The region was home to several bands of Lakota; several skirmishes between the Lakota and the U.S. Army took place in the 1860s and 1870s.  Crazy Horse was killed at Fort Robinson in 1877.  In 1879, Dull Knife led the Cheyenne Outbreak from Fort Robinson.

Protected areas
A large portion of the Pine Ridge is owned or managed by either the Nebraska Game and Parks Commission or by various U.S. Government agencies for preservation and recreation uses.  These areas include:
Chadron State Park
Fort Robinson
Metcalf Wildlife Management Area
Nebraska National Forest
Pine Ridge National Recreation Area
Soldier Creek Wilderness
Oglala National Grassland
Hudson-Meng Bison Kill
Toadstool Geologic Park
Peterson Wildlife Management Area
Ponderosa Wildlife Management Area

See also
Sowbelly Canyon

External links
U.S. Forest Service - Pine Ridge Ranger District
Nebraska Game and Parks Commission Land Atlas

Regions of Nebraska
Regions of South Dakota
Escarpments of the United States
Landforms of Nebraska
Landforms of South Dakota